The Destruction of Small Ideas is the third studio album by 65daysofstatic. It was released on April 30, 2007, in the United Kingdom, May 1, 2007 in the United States on Monotreme, and April 23, 2007, in Japan on Zankyo.

"Don't Go Down to Sorrow" was the first single from the album, released in the UK on April 9, in the United States on April 17, and in Japan on March 23.

A double-gatefold vinyl version of the album was released on 12 November 2007, also through Monotreme Records.

On its release the album's production was criticised by some reviewers, but the band have stated in an interview that this was intentional and directly influenced by an article written by Nick Southall for Stylus Magazine.

Track listing
"When We Were Younger & Better" – 6:54
"A Failsafe" – 4:28
"Don't Go Down to Sorrow" – 6:55
"Wax Futures" – 4:03
"These Things You Can't Unlearn" – 6:27
"Lyonesse" – 3:26
"Music Is Music as Devices Are Kisses Is Everything" – 5:20
"The Distant & Mechanised Glow of Eastern European Dance Parties" – 3:33
"Little Victories" – 5:14
"Primer" – 4:51
"White Peak/Dark Peak" – 3:57
"The Conspiracy of Seeds" (featuring Circle Takes the Square) – 7:08

References

External links
 

2007 albums
65daysofstatic albums
Music in Sheffield